The 1998 California State Controller election occurred on November 3, 1998. The primary elections took place on June 3, 1998. The Democratic incumbent, Kathleen Connell, defeated the Republican nominee, Ruben Barrales in a landslide, winning every county except three: Glenn, Kern, and Sutter. Every candidate was unopposed in the primary.

Results
Final results from the Secretary of State of California.

Results by county
Final results from the Secretary of State of California.

See also
California state elections, 1998
State of California
Secretary of State of California

References

State Controller election
California State Controller elections
California State Controller election
California